Donald A. Blakey (born February 5, 1936, in Washington, D.C.) is an American politician and a former Republican member of the Delaware House of Representatives representing District 34.

Education
Blakey earned his BS in physical education from Delaware State College (now Delaware State University), his MA from University of Maryland, College Park, and his PhD in theatre arts from Pacific Western University (now California Miramar University).

Elections
2012 Blakey was unopposed for the September 11, 2012 Republican Primary and won the three-way November 6, 2012 General election with 5,680 votes (56.7%) against Democratic nominee Theodore Yacucci and Independent Party of Delaware candidate Douglas Beatty.
2006 When Republican Representative Gerald Buckworth retired and left the District 34 seat open, Blakey was unopposed for the September 12, 2006 Republican Primary and won the November 7, 2006 General election with 3,560 votes (56.1%) against Democratic nominee M. Jeanine Kleimo.
2008 Blakey was unopposed for the September 9, 2008 Republican Primary and won the November 4, 2008 General election with 6,229 votes (61.3%) against Democratic nominee G. Bruce Hamilton.
2010 Blakey was unopposed for the September 17, 2010 Republican Primary and won the four-way November 2, 2010 General election with 5,015 votes (61.7%) against Democratic nominee Jill Fuchs, Independent Party of Delaware candidate Johnathan Marango, and Independent Michael Tedesco.

References

External links
Official page at the Delaware General Assembly
Campaign site
 

1936 births
Living people
African-American state legislators in Delaware
California Miramar University alumni
Delaware State University alumni
Delaware State University faculty
Republican Party members of the Delaware House of Representatives
People from Dover, Delaware
Politicians from Washington, D.C.
University of Maryland, College Park alumni
21st-century African-American people
20th-century African-American people